In mathematics, the modular group  is the projective special linear group  of  matrices with integer coefficients and determinant 1. The modular group acts on the upper-half of the complex plane by fractional linear transformations, and the name "modular group" comes from the relation to moduli spaces and not from modular arithmetic.

Definition
The modular group  is the group of linear fractional transformations of the upper half of the complex plane, which have the form

The group operation is function composition.

This group of transformations is isomorphic to the projective special linear group , which is the quotient of the 2-dimensional special linear group  over the integers by its center .  In other words,  consists of all matrices

The group operation is the usual multiplication of matrices.

Some authors define the modular group to be , and still others define the modular group to be the larger group . 

Some mathematical relations require the consideration of the group  of matrices with determinant plus or minus one. ( is a subgroup of this group.)  Similarly,  is the quotient group . A  matrix with unit determinant is a symplectic matrix, and thus , the symplectic group of  matrices.

Finding elements 
For example, if  then the determinant equation readsthen taking  and  gives , henceis a matrix.

Number-theoretic properties
The unit determinant of

More generally, if  is an irreducible fraction, then

is also irreducible (again, provided the denominator be non-zero).

such that

Elements of the modular group provide a symmetry on the two-dimensional lattice. Let  and  be two complex numbers whose ratio is not real. Then the set of points

is a lattice of parallelograms on the plane.  A different pair of vectors  and  will generate exactly the same lattice if and only if

It is for this reason that doubly periodic functions, such as elliptic functions, possess a modular group symmetry.

The action of the modular group on the rational numbers can most easily be understood by envisioning a square grid, with grid point  corresponding to the fraction  (see Euclid's orchard).  An irreducible fraction is one that is visible from the origin; the action of the modular group on a fraction never takes a visible (irreducible) to a hidden (reducible) one, and vice versa.

Note that any member of the modular group maps the projectively extended real line one-to-one to itself, and furthermore bijectively maps the projectively extended rational line (the rationals with infinity) to itself, the irrationals to the irrationals, the transcendental numbers to the transcendental numbers, the non-real numbers to the non-real numbers, the upper half-plane to the upper half-plane, et cetera.

Important special cases of continued fraction convergents include the Fibonacci numbers and solutions to Pell's equation. In both cases, the numbers can be arranged to form a semigroup subset of the modular group.

Group-theoretic properties

Presentation 
The modular group can be shown to be generated by the two transformations

Geometrically,  represents inversion in the unit circle followed by reflection with respect to the imaginary axis, while  represents a unit translation to the right.

It can be shown  that these are a complete set of relations, so the modular group has the presentation:

This presentation describes the modular group as the rotational triangle group  (infinity as there is no relation on ), and it thus maps onto all triangle groups  by adding the relation , which occurs for instance in the congruence subgroup .

Braid group

The braid group  is the universal central extension of the modular group, with these sitting as lattices inside the (topological) universal covering group .

The braid group  in turn is isomorphic to the knot group of the trefoil knot.

Quotients
The quotients by congruence subgroups are of significant interest.

Presenting as a matrix group 
The group  can be generated by the two matrices

 

since

 

Relationship to hyperbolic geometry

The modular group is important because it forms a subgroup of the group of isometries of the hyperbolic plane.  If we consider the upper half-plane model  of hyperbolic plane geometry, then the group of all
orientation-preserving isometries of  consists of all Möbius transformations of the form

In terms of projective coordinates, the group  acts on the upper half-plane  by projectivity:

This action is faithful.

Tessellation of the hyperbolic plane

(Care is needed on the boundary of the domain.)

There are many ways of constructing a fundamental domain, but a common choice is the region

This region is a hyperbolic triangle.

There is a strong connection between the modular group and elliptic curves.
Two points in the upper half-plane give isomorphic elliptic curves if and only if they are related by a transformation in the modular group.  Thus, the quotient of the upper half-plane by the action of the modular group is the so-called moduli space of elliptic curves: a space whose points describe isomorphism classes of elliptic curves.  This is often visualized as the fundamental domain described above, with some points on its boundary identified.

The modular group and its subgroups are also a source of interesting tilings of the hyperbolic plane.  By transforming this fundamental domain in turn by each of the elements of the modular group, a regular tessellation of the hyperbolic plane by congruent hyperbolic triangles known as the V6.6.∞ Infinite-order triangular tiling is created.  Note that each such triangle has one vertex either at infinity or on the real axis . 

This tiling can be extended to the Poincaré disk, where every hyperbolic triangle has one vertex on the boundary of the disk. The tiling of the Poincaré disk is given in a natural way by the -invariant, which is invariant under the modular group, and attains every complex number once in each triangle of these regions.  

This tessellation can be refined slightly, dividing each region into two halves (conventionally colored black and white), by adding an orientation-reversing map; the colors then correspond to orientation of the domain.

The map of groups  (from modular group to triangle group) can be visualized in terms of this tiling (yielding a tiling on the modular curve), as depicted in the video at right.

Congruence subgroups

Important subgroups of the modular group , called congruence subgroups, are given by imposing congruence relations on the associated matrices.

There is a natural homomorphism  given by reducing the entries modulo . This induces a homomorphism on the modular group . The kernel of this homomorphism is called the principal congruence subgroup of level , denoted . We have the following short exact sequence:

Being the kernel of a homomorphism  is a normal subgroup of the modular group . The group  is given as the set of all modular transformations

It is easy to show that the trace of a matrix representing an element of  cannot be −1, 0, or 1, so these subgroups are torsion-free groups. (There are other torsion-free subgroups.)

The principal congruence subgroup of level 2, is also called the modular group .

The modular curves associated with these groups are an aspect of monstrous moonshine – for a prime number , the modular curve of the normalizer is genus zero if and only if  divides the order of the monster group, or equivalently, if  is a supersingular prime.

Dyadic monoid
One important subset of the modular group is the dyadic monoid, which is the monoid of all strings of the form  for positive integers . This monoid occurs naturally in the study of fractal curves, and describes  the self-similarity symmetries of the Cantor function, Minkowski's question mark function, and the Koch snowflake, each being a special case of the general de Rham curve. The monoid also has higher-dimensional linear representations; for example, the  representation can be understood to describe the self-symmetry of the blancmange curve.

Maps of the torus
The algebraic properties of a matrix as an element of  correspond to the dynamics of the induced map of the torus.

Hecke groups
The modular group can be generalized to the Hecke groups, named for Erich Hecke, and defined as follows.

where .

more generally one has

which corresponds to the triangle group .

History
The modular group and its subgroups were first studied in detail by Richard Dedekind and by Felix Klein as part of his Erlangen programme in the 1870s. However, the closely related elliptic functions were studied by Joseph Louis Lagrange in 1785, and further results on elliptic functions were published by Carl Gustav Jakob Jacobi and Niels Henrik Abel in 1827.

See also

Bianchi group
Classical modular curve
Fuchsian group
-invariant
Kleinian group
Mapping class group
Minkowski's question-mark function
Möbius transformation
Modular curve
Modular form
Kuṭṭaka
Poincaré half-plane model
Uniform tilings in hyperbolic plane

References

 .

Group theory
Analytic number theory
Modular forms